These are the official results of the Women's 10 km walk event at the 1990 European Championships in Split, Yugoslavia, held on August 29, 1990.

Medalists

Abbreviations
All times shown are in hours:minutes:seconds

Records

Results

Participation
According to an unofficial count, 24 athletes from 12 countries participated in the event.

 (1)
 (2)
 (1)
 (3)
 (3)
 (1)
 (1)
 (3)
 (3)
 (2)
 (3)
 (1)

See also
 1987 Women's World Championships 10km Walk (Rome)
 1991 Women's World Championships 10km Walk (Tokyo)
 1992 Women's Olympic 10km Walk (Barcelona)
 1993 Women's World Championships 10km Walk (Stuttgart)

References

 Results

Walk 10 km
Racewalking at the European Athletics Championships
1990 in women's athletics